Balzheim is a municipality in the district of Alb-Donau in Baden-Württemberg in Germany.

Notable people
 Christian Wirth, called 'Christian the cruel', (1885–1944), German policeman, SS-Sturmbannführer, first commander of Belzec extermination camp, decisively involved in Aktion T4 .

References

Alb-Donau-Kreis